Murrungal Shire was a local government area in the South West Slopes region of New South Wales, Australia.

Murrungal Shire was proclaimed on 7 March 1906, one of 134 shires created after the passing of the Local Government (Shires) Act 1905. 

The shire office was in Boorowa.  Towns and villages in the shire included  Frogmore, Reids Flat, Rugby and Rye Park.

Murrungal Shire was amalgamated with the Municipality of Burrowa to form Boorowa Shire on 1 September 1944.

References

Former local government areas of New South Wales
1906 establishments in Australia
1944 disestablishments in Australia